Keuper is a surname. Notable people with the surname include:

 Jerome P. Keuper (1921–2002), American physicist
 Ken Keuper (1918–1997), American football player

See also
Kepper

Occupational surnames
German-language surnames